Itamar Soares Rangel (born 3 May 1986) is a Brazilian former professional footballer.

Career

Indonesia
Adjusting quickly to the Indonesian culture when joining PSM Makassar, Rangel was not used to the cacophonous support at stadiums during games and had to return to Brazil for injury.

Singapore
Inking a deal with Balestier Khalsa of the local S.League, the Brazilian midfielder mixed with another Brazilian and a Chilean. There, he attracted the interest of Clube Náutico Capibaribe back in Brazil, later moving there and scoring on his debut.

References

External links 
 Impasse com o Souza-PB pode abreviar permanência de Itamar no Náutico
 at Soccerway

Living people
1986 births
Association football midfielders
Brazilian footballers
Expatriate footballers in Indonesia
Brazilian expatriate footballers
Brazilian expatriate sportspeople in Singapore
Expatriate footballers in Singapore
Brazilian expatriate sportspeople in Indonesia
Sportspeople from Rio de Janeiro (state)
Singapore Premier League players
PSM Makassar players
Balestier Khalsa FC players
Clube Náutico Capibaribe players